is a Japanese cel-shaded anime short film written and directed by Shuhei Morita.

The children who play this disappear, believed to be spirited away by demons. Kakurenbo follows Hikora, a boy who joins the game with hopes of finding his missing sister, Sorincha. The storyline is built on the idea that Tokyo is losing its natural aesthetic, which includes child's games such as hide and seek in order for industrial progress to ensue i.e. lighting the city of Tokyo costing innocence of childhood games.

Characters 

The young boy who plays the game to find his missing sister.

Hikora's sister who went missing when she played the game with the other children.

Hikora's best friend who plays the game to lend a hand in finding Sorincha.

The leader of his little gang who claims is not afraid of demons.

One of the members in Noshiga's gang. He has blond hair and wears glasses.

Another member of Noshiga's gang. He is short and has a large, red scarf.
 and 
Twin brothers with a dark past. Their reason for playing is a mystery.

Demons 
Once the seven children pass through the gates to enter the abandoned streets, they are pursued by four different demons and then finally by the one demon who is "it". They guard the battery tower within the center of the city, where every child they catch is taken to be used as power cells for the city. The tower has socket rows that go on to the very first children who played.

A three-armed, four-legged, red humanoid demon that holds a mechanical wheel on its back. Captures Tachiji, and then Suku.

A horned komainu demon that wears a tarp over its back. Captures Noshiga.

The twin child-like demons. One is sitting on a menacing-looking cart, while the other pulls it. Captures both Inmu and Yanku.

A spider-like demon with eight arms. Captures Yaimao.

A nine-tailed fox who is the leader of the demons. It possesses the last child who wins the game of "Otokoyo", and wears a fox mask that changes into an oni mask that the person who is "it" wears. In the beginning of the film, it possessed Sorincha (who apparently won the game before Hikora), and in the end, it possessed Hikora after he won the game.

Reception 
Kakurenbo premiered in March 2005 at the Tokyo International Anime Fair, where it won the award for Notable Entry in the General Category. In Korea, it received a Best Film Nomination at the Seoul Comics and Animation Festival. It then went on to win Best Short film at the Fantasia Festival in Montreal.

It was shown on Adult Swim on Halloween 2005.

References

External links 
 
 
 
 

2004 films
2004 anime films
2004 horror films
2000s animated short films
Anime short films
Anime with original screenplays
Cel-shaded animation
Horror anime and manga
Japanese animated horror films
Japanese mythology in anime and manga
Films about spirit possession
Yōkai in anime and manga